Nyanga, originally known as Inyanga, is a town in Zimbabwe.

Location
It is located in Nyanga District, Manicaland Province, in northeastern Zimbabwe, close to the International border with Mozambique.

Overview
Nyanga is primarily a tourist town and is a popular tourist destination with its fishing, golf courses, mountain hikes and holiday resorts. The surrounding areas also contain many Stone Age and Iron Age archaeological remains such as pit structures, stone forts, terraces and pathways. Inside the town is the bustling township of Nyamhuka, around which there is an ever expanding growth of high and medium-density housing. Nyanga is also host to the largest army training camp in Zimbabwe, hosting recruits from across Africa.

History
The Nyanga region has long been regarded as a place of great natural beauty. I would like to try sheep and apple growing." Rhodes displaced the inhabitants and the chieftainship of the wonderful place- the Sakarombes of the Lion-Zebra (Shumba-Nyambizi totem) who found refuge in the semi-arid areas of Nyanga in Ruwangwe.
Nyanga has been made famous in Scotland by the 1960 Hamish Henderson song Freedom Come-All-Ye as the birthplace of an unnamed black man who will overthrow the Afrikaaner Government.

Population
The current population of Nyanga is not publicly known. According to the 1982 Population Census, the town had a population of 2,973. In 2004, the population of the town was estimated at 4,850. The next national population census in Zimbabwe is scheduled from 18 August 2012 through 28 August 2012.

Image gallery

See also
 Ziwa
 Rusape
 Catandica
 Honde Valley

References

Populated places in Manicaland Province
Nyanga District